VA-133 was a short-lived Attack Squadron of the U.S. Navy, nicknamed the Blue Knights. It was established on 21 August 1961 and disestablished a year later, on 1 October 1962. It was based at NAS Cecil Field and flew A4D-2 Skyhawk aircraft.

Operational history

August 1961: The squadron was established as part of a new Air Group to increase the strength of the fleet as a result of the Berlin Crisis of 1961.
8–19 February 1962: A squadron detachment was aboard  for carrier trials and in a standby status for possible assistance during Project Mercury, the launching of Lieutenant Colonel John H. Glenn, USMC, in Mercury spacecraft Friendship 7.
March–May 1962: The squadron participated in Constellation’s shakedown cruise in the Caribbean.

See also

 List of squadrons in the Dictionary of American Naval Aviation Squadrons
 Second VA-134 (U.S. Navy), a "sister squadron"
 Attack aircraft
 List of inactive United States Navy aircraft squadrons
 History of the United States Navy

References

External links

Attack squadrons of the United States Navy
Wikipedia articles incorporating text from the Dictionary of American Naval Aviation Squadrons